Songer Township is one of twelve townships in Clay County, Illinois, USA.  As of the 2010 census, its population was 342 and it contained 160 housing units.

Geography

Unincorporated towns
 Bethel (historical)
(This list is based on USGS data and may include former settlements.)

Cemeteries
The township contains these four cemeteries: Edwards Family, Oak Mound, Parker and Songer.

Major highways
  US Route 50

Lakes
 Greendale Lake

Demographics

School districts
 Flora Community Unit School District 35

Political districts
 Illinois' 19th congressional district
 State House District 108
 State Senate District 54

References
 
 United States Census Bureau 2007 TIGER/Line Shapefiles
 United States National Atlas

External links
 City-Data.com
 Illinois State Archives

Townships in Clay County, Illinois
Townships in Illinois